Darpas (also romanized as Darbas) is a town in the Lori Province of Armenia.

References 
 
 World Gazeteer: Armenia – World-Gazetteer.com

Populated places in Lori Province